The Económico TV (ETV) was a private Portuguese digital cable business news television channel that is owned by the same group of the Portuguese newspaper Diário Económico and Brazilian Brasil Econômico. It is available on cable, satellite and Internet streaming. The channel was launched in 2010 as an exclusive in Portugal to NOS, one year later it became available on MEO platform.

References

24-hour television news channels in Portugal
Television channels and stations established in 2010
Portuguese-language television stations